Aulnoy may refer to:

 Madame d'Aulnoy
 Aulnoy, Seine-et-Marne, a commune of the Seine-et-Marne département, in France